The Outer Ring Road is a 6-lane ring road that encircles the city of Delhi. It has three lanes in each direction, with a total length of 47 km.  Although it used to have traffic lights and at-grade intersections, mushrooming interchanges have reduced the number of lights to just two, and traffic now flows much more smoothly. Several stretches of the Outer Ring Road have been notified as National Highways.

Delhi features two ring roads, a main one and an outer one. The two ring roads have a combined length of 87 km.

Junctions  

Outer Ring Road features 14 junctions. In no particular order, they are:

NH 8/Subruto Park,
Vasant Kunj/Munirka/R.K. Puram,
IIT Gate (flyover),
Khel Gaon Marg (flyover), near Malviya Nagar and Panchsheel Colony
Madan Gir/Chirag Delhi (flyover)/Andrews Ganj,
Kalkaji/Nehru Place (flyover),
Modi Mill (flyover),
Okhla,

ISBT (flyover),
Majnu Ka Tilla,
Majra Burari,
Azad Pur/Jahingir Pur,
Rohini,
Peera Garhi,
Sundar Vihar,
Vikas Puri,
Janakpuri(Pankha Road)
Delhi Cantt(Cariappa Marg)

Pedestrian Underpasses 
Like the Ring Road, Delhi's Outer Ring Road features some semblance of grade separation between pedestrian and vehicular traffic.  Pedestrian underpasses are present at the following points:

Near Chirag Delhi Flyover (DTTDC)
Near IIT Flyover (DTTDC)
Dr. Hedgewar Marg at Saraswati Vihar
Soaminagar
Mangol Puri
Paras Cinema Flyover, Nehru Place
Munirka
Sarvpriya Vihar
Power House, Pitampura
Rama Market, Pitampura

Additional pedestrian underpasses are to be constructed at the following points:

Kalkaji Temple junction
Panchsheel Colony

Gallery

See also
Inner Ring Road, New Delhi

References

External links 
 Article about a recent grade separation project, and the at-grade intersection at Moolchand
 grade speration along the AIIMS-Naraina stretch
 Robotic sweepers on Delhi's ring road
 Delhi Public Works Department
Delhi Traffic Police

Roads in Delhi
New Delhi
Ring roads in India